The 4th Legislative Assembly of British Columbia sat from 1882 to 1886. The members were elected in the British Columbia general election held in July 1882. Robert Beaven formed a minority government in 1882. The Beaven government fell on a Motion of no confidence in January 1883. William Smithe formed a new government later that month.

There were four sessions of the 4th Legislature:

John Andrew Mara served as speaker.

Members of the 4th General Assembly 
The following members were elected to the assembly in 1882:

Notes:

By-elections 
By-elections were held for the following members appointed to the provincial cabinet, as was required at the time:
William James Armstrong, Provincial Secretary, elected September 18, 1882
Simeon Duck, Minister of Finance, elected April 15, 1885
Alexander Edmund Batson Davie, Attorney General, acclaimed March 31, 1883
William Smithe, Premier, acclaimed March 31, 1883
John Robson, Provincial Secretary, Minister of Finance and Agriculture and Minister of Mines, acclaimed March 31, 1883

By-elections were held to replace members for various other reasons:

References 

Political history of British Columbia
Terms of British Columbia Parliaments
1882 establishments in British Columbia
1886 disestablishments in British Columbia